Cora was a schooner launched at Baltimore in 1812. Captain Joseph Gold acquired a letter of marque and Cora was commissioned on 26 July.

Cora was at Annapolis when on 21 July a large brig, not flying any colours, came to anchor in the mouth of the Severn river. The fort fired on the brig, but she was too far away for the shots to reach. Captain Gold had not yet arrived so Coras Chief Mate, Richard P. Weathers, weighed anchor and stood toward the brig. As a pilot brought Bloodhound into Annapolis Cora came alongside and took possession of her and brought her under the guns of Fort Madison, a battery on Beaman's Point. Bloodhounds crew were interned in the barracks there and under guard. The United States Government had Bloodhound released to take dispatches back to Plymouth as she was on a diplomatic mission.

Fate: The boats of the British squadron blockading the Chesapeake captured Cora on 14 February 1813. In describing Cora, Captain George Burdett of  described Cora as being on her first voyage and the fastest vessel out of Baltimore. She was returning from Bordeaux with a valuable cargo of brandy, wine, silks, flints, and the like. She had fired on the boats that captured her, but she had not been able to inflict any casualties.

Notes citations, and references
Notes

Citations

References
 

1812 ships
Ships built in Baltimore
Captured ships